Robertson Point Light, also known as Cremorne Point Light, is an active lighthouse in Cremorne Point, a suburb on the lower North Shore of Sydney, New South Wales, Australia. It is the sibling of Bradleys Head Light.

The lighthouse is mounted on a rock and connected to shore by a footbridge.

The light characteristic shown is a green occulting light with a cycle of three seconds (Oc.G. 3s), the same as Bradleys Head Light.

Site operation 
The light is operated by the Sydney Ports Corporation, while the site is managed by the North Sydney Municipal Council as part of the Cremorne Point Reserve.

Visiting 
The site is open and accessible to the public, but the tower itself is closed. Parking is available at the end of Milson Road in Cremorne Point.

See also 

 List of lighthouses in Australia

References 

  Listed as "Cremorne Point" and not to be confused with "Robertson Point" listed on p. 106.

External links 
 
 
 

Lighthouses completed in 1910
Lighthouses in Sydney
1910 establishments in Australia